"Fighting Fire" is a single by drum and bass/dubstep producer and DJ Breakage, featuring vocals from English singer and musician Jess Mills. It was released on 27 February 2011 as a digital download in the United Kingdom. The song peaked at number 34 on the UK Singles Chart.

Critical reception
Lewis Corner of Digital Spy gave the song a positive review stating:
"What could be better than fighting fire with you?" she inquires over a combination of pumping beats and deep rhythmic bass that's got more than a whiff of the mid-1990s dance to it (Cream toilets? - Ed.). It's stylish, sure, and cool as a cucumber in the chiller cabinet at Shoreditch Tesco, but perhaps a bit too laid-back and self-assured to join its bolshier chums - hey 'I Need Air', hiya 'Lights On'! - right at the top of the charts.

Track listing

Chart performance

Release history

References

2011 songs
2011 singles
English electronic songs